Compass is a 60-minute local CBC television news program based in Charlottetown, Prince Edward Island, Canada. Broadcast weeknights from 6:00 to 7:00 p.m. AT on CBCT-DT, it is the only PEI-specific television newscast available in the province.

The newscast launched as a single 60-minute newscast in 1986, with Roger Younker as its anchor from its inception until his departure in 2002. Younker became well-known and trusted within Prince Edward Island. The program's humorous and popular weatherman, Kevin "Boomer" Gallant, also joined the show in 1986.

Bruce Rainnie replaced Younker as the show's permanent host in 2003, and announced on February 23, 2017 that he would be departing Compass at the end of April. Less than a week later, longtime weatherman Kevin "Boomer" Gallant announced his retirement after 31 years with Compass. Both Gallant and Rainnie ended their tenures with the program on Friday, April 28, 2017.

Sarah Fraser assumed interim anchor duties for Compass on May 1, 2017, and Kalin Mitchell (weatherman for CBHT and CBAT) assumed temporary weather forecasting duties the same day, He later worked at CTV Atlantic on March 26, 2018.

On May 30, 2017, Louise Martin was named permanent host, and Jay Scotland permanent weather meteorologist.

Overview
In about 1995, reporter Sara Fraser was brought on as co-anchor with Younker. But in 2000, as a result of budget-cuts, all local supper-hour CBC newscasts were replaced with Canada Now, a hybrid national and local newscasts.  Younker continued as sole anchor of the PEI-specific half from Charlottetown, with a national program following at 6:30PM local time, presented by Ian Hanomansing from the network's Vancouver studios. In 2002, with Younker's departure, former co-host and long-time correspondent Sara Fraser temporarily succeeded him for one year. In 2003, newcomer Bruce Rainnie was brought in as a permanent replacement for Younker/Fraser as the anchor, and brought his own unique style to the program. Sara Fraser continues as a frequent substitute anchor and correspondent. In May 2006, the local half of the newscast was renamed CBC News at Six: Prince Edward Island.

In February 2007, Canada Now was scrapped.  The same day, the Prince Edward Island newscast was expanded to a full hour, with local news in the first 30 minutes and national & international news in the second half-hour - albeit, produced and presented locally. The title of the program was also changed back to the original Compass.

In September 2009, Compass was split into two separate half-hour newscasts, at 5:00 PM and 6:00 PM, with the pan-regional program CBC News: Maritimes at 5:30 from CBAT aired at 5:30 PM. In January 2010, CBC News: Maritimes at 5:30 was cancelled and replaced with a 5:30 p.m. edition of Compass, effectively creating a 90-minute program. In October 2015, Compass returned to a one-hour format.

On March 18, 2020, due to the COVID-19 pandemic in Canada, the Canadian Broadcasting Corporation ceased broadcast of many local newscasts across the country, including Compass. After receiving backlash for the decision by many including Prince Edward Island's Premier Dennis King, CBC announced on March 25 that Compass would return to the air on March 26.

Recognition
In October 2008, the program won a Gemini award for its coverage of a major ice storm earlier that year.

Notable on-air staff

Anchors
Roger Younker (1986–2002)
Sara Fraser (1995–2000; 2002–2003; 2017)
Bruce Rainnie (2003–2017)
Louise Martin (2017–present)

Weather
Kevin "Boomer" Gallant (1986–2017)
Kalin Mitchell (2017)
Jay Scotland (2017–present)

Other staff
Sara Fraser 
Brian Higgins
Kerry Campbell
Tom Steepe

See also
CBC Television local newscasts

References

External links
CBC Prince Edward Island | Programs | CBC News: Compass
Canadian Broadcasting Corporation

1980s Canadian television news shows
CBC Television original programming
1986 Canadian television series debuts
CBC News
Culture of Charlottetown
Television shows filmed in Prince Edward Island
1990s Canadian television news shows
2000s Canadian television news shows
2010s Canadian television news shows
2020s Canadian television news shows